Andrew Tod (born 4 November 1971) is a Scottish former professional footballer, who played mainly as a defender.

Career
Tod, a versatile player who could play in defence or attack.

Tod started his professional career at Dunfermline Athletic in 1992. After being a regular goal scorer within Junior Football, then manager Bert Paton decided to bring the striker to East End Park.

He departed East End Park in 2001 to join Bradford City for £100,000 after an initial loan spell saw him score four goals in 12 league games, including a double against Wimbledon in October 2001.

He fell out of favour at Bradford after joining permanently, however, and returned to Scotland with loan spells at Hearts and Dundee United before returning permanently with former club Dunfermline Athletic in 2003. During January 2007, Tod was told that he was no longer needed at East End Park by manager Stephen Kenny.

On 11 July 2007, Tod moved to Dunfermline Athletic's Fife rivals Raith Rovers on a free transfer.

Without starting a game for Raith in the 2008–09 season, he was loaned out to team up with his former manager Dick Campbell at Forfar Athletic on 31 October 2008, signing a permanent contract three months later.

Tod spent the next two seasons with the Loons before retiring in January 2011 to take up a job as a police officer.

References

External links

Living people
1971 births
Scottish footballers
Kelty Hearts F.C. players
Dunfermline Athletic F.C. players
Stockport County F.C. players
Bradford City A.F.C. players
Heart of Midlothian F.C. players
Dundee United F.C. players
Raith Rovers F.C. players
Forfar Athletic F.C. players
Scottish Premier League players
Scottish Football League players
English Football League players
Scottish Junior Football Association players
Association football defenders